Hunter College High School is a secondary school located in the Carnegie Hill neighborhood on the Upper East Side of Manhattan. It is administered by Hunter College of the City University of New York (CUNY). Hunter is publicly funded, and there is no tuition fee. Enrollment is approximately 1200 students. According to the school, "students accepted to Hunter represent the top one-quarter of 1% of students in New York City, based on test scores."

Hunter has been ranked as the top public high school in the United States by both The Wall Street Journal and Worth. The New York Times called Hunter "the prestigious Upper East Side school known for its Ivy League-bound students" and "the fast track to law, medicine and academia." Publicly available data indicate that Hunter has the highest average SAT score, the highest average ACT score and the highest percentage of National Merit Finalists of any high school in the United States, public or private.

History
Hunter was established in 1869 as "The Female Normal and High School", a private school to prepare young women to become teachers. The original school was composed of an elementary and a high school. A kindergarten was added in 1887, and in 1888, the school was incorporated into a college. The high school was separated from what would become Hunter College in 1903. In 1914, both schools were named after the Female Normal School's first president, Thomas Hunter. The school was almost closed by Hunter College President Jacqueline Wexler in the early 1970s.

Hunter was an all-girls school for its first 105 years, with the official name "Hunter College High School for Intellectually Gifted Young Ladies". The prototypical Hunter girl was the subject of the song Sarah Maria Jones, who, the lyrics told, had "Hunter in her bones." In 1878, Harper's Magazine published an approving article about the then-new school:
The first thing to excite our wonder and admiration was the number – there were 1,542 pupils; the second thing was the earnestness of the discipline; and the third was the suggestiveness of so many girls at work in assembly, with their own education as the primary aim, and the education of countless thousands of others as the final aim, of their toil.
Girls all the way from fourteen to twenty years of age, from the farther edge of childhood to the farther limit of maidenhood; girls with every shade of complexion and degree of beauty; girls in such variety that it was amazing to contemplate the reduction of their individuality to the simple uniformity of their well-drilled movements.
The catholicity and toleration crystallized in the country's Constitution prevail in the college: about two hundred of the students are Jewesses, and a black face, framed in curly African hair, may occasionally be seen.
The aim of the entire course through which the Normal students pass is not so much to burden the mind with facts as it is to develop intellectual power, cultivate judgment, and enable the graduates to take trained ability into the world with them.

The school began admitting boys in 1974 as a result of a lawsuit by Hunter College Elementary School parents, a development which was described in the New York Daily News with the headline "Girlie High Gets 1st Freshboys." In January 1982, the school was featured in a New York Magazine article entitled "The Joyful Elite." Hunter was the subject of the 1992 book Hunter College Campus Schools for the Gifted: The Challenge of Equity and Excellence published by Teachers' College Press.

The high school has occupied a number of buildings throughout its history, including one at the East 68th Street campus of the college (1940–1970). For several years in the 1970s, it was housed on the 13th and 14th floors of an office building at 466 Lexington Avenue (at East 46th Street), the current location of what is now known as the Park Avenue Atrium. Since 1977, it has existed at the former site of the Madison Avenue Armory at East 94th Street between Park and Madison Avenues on the Upper East Side. Although most of the armory building was demolished, the armory's facade, including two empty towers, was left partly standing on Madison Avenue. The school building itself, which faces Park Avenue, was constructed to resemble the armory. Because of its unusual design, including many classrooms without windows and the rest with only narrow windows, Hunter is called "The Brick Prison." The building contains both the high school (grades 7–12) and the elementary school (K-6), which are collectively known as the Hunter College Campus Schools.

Tony Fisher is the principal of the high school. Dawn Roy is the principal of the elementary school, and Lisa Siegmann is the Director of the Campus Schools. Jacqueline Zenon is the assistant principal for grades 7–9, while Maysa Perez Antonio is the assistant principal for grades 10–12.

Admissions
Admission to the high school is only granted in seventh grade, and is a two-step process. Students from the five boroughs of New York City who have high scores on standardized tests are eligible to take the Hunter College High School entrance exam in the January of their sixth grade school year. Eligible students must first meet Hunter's standards in reading and mathematical proficiency on fifth-grade standardized exams, namely public school students must score at the 90th percentile (statewide) or above on both the New York State reading and math tests, while private and parochial school students must score in the 90th percentile (of all of the private school students in the country) or above on both the reading and math tests administered by their schools. This results in an eligible pool of much less than 10% of New York City fifth graders for two reasons. The first is that much fewer than 10% of New York City public school students score above the statewide 90th percentile on either the math or reading test. The second reason is that a student must score in the top 10% on both reading and math tests (so for example, a student scoring in the 99% percentile in math and the 89% percentile in reading will not be eligible to sit for the test, even though their overall score is in the 95th percentile). Thus, of about 65,000 fifth-graders in New York City, only 2,500 will be eligible to take the test. Most of those, between 2,000 and 2,300, do sit for the test and of those, between 182 and 185 are offered admission. Thus, "students accepted to Hunter represent the top one-quarter of 1% of students in New York City, based on test scores." For example, in 2015, 182 (8.8%) of 2064 test takers were offered admission.
The other entrance to Hunter is through the elementary school. Prospective students must take an exam before kindergarten and pass in order to be eligible for HCES. 
Approximately 45 students from Hunter College Elementary School also enter the 7th grade class each year. Beginning with incoming students in the 2010–2011 school year, elementary school students must make "satisfactory progress" by fifth grade in order to gain admission to the high school. Prior to this, students at Hunter College Elementary School were guaranteed admission into the high school.

In total, an entering 7th grade class contains approximately 225 students, known as "Hunterites," about 200 of whom will graduate from the school. Those who leave go to other magnet schools, private schools, local public schools or leave the city. Some of those who leave are expelled, usually for low grades. The total enrollment from grades 7 through 12 is approximately 1,200 students.

Concerns about admission policies

Author and alumnus Chris Hayes stated in Twilight of the Elites: America After Meritocracy that the school's sole reliance on the one test for admissions reproduces societal inequalities; that students whose families cannot afford intensive test prep courses are less likely to earn competitive scores on the entrance exam. In recent years underrepresentation of African-Americans among students admitted to the school, compared to their numbers in the public school system, has increased. Hayes quotes Hunter College High School's 2010 graduate Justin Hudson's commencement speech:
If you truly believe that the demographics of Hunter represent the distribution of intelligence in this city then you must believe that the Upper West Side, Bayside and Flushing are intrinsically more intelligent than the South Bronx, Bedford-Stuyvesant and Washington Heights, and I refuse to accept that.

Because of its relatively small size, and because the school is run by Hunter College rather than by the city's education department, Hunter has largely avoided being caught up in the debate over diversity at the specialized high schools in New York City. However, some alumni, students, and alumni expressed concern about the lack of diversity at the school where only 6.3 percent of the student body is Hispanic and 2.2 percent African-American (67% of NYC public school children are black or Hispanic). On the other hand, while Asians make up 16.2% of NYC public-school children, they make up 49.4% of the student body at the school, based on NYC department of education data.

In 2021, some elected officials in New York City urged Hunter College High School to suspend its entrance examination because of the COVID-19 pandemic.

Academics

In light of Hunter's academic excellence, The Wall Street Journal ranked it as the top public school in the United States and noted that it is a feeder to Ivy League and other elite colleges. Worth likewise ranked Hunter as the top public school in the country. The New York Times called Hunter "the prestigious Upper East Side school known for its Ivy League-bound students" and "the fast track to law, medicine and academia." Publicly available data indicate that Hunter has both the highest average SAT score and the highest average ACT score of any school in the United States, public or private, though complete data is needed to be conclusive.

Hunter offers "a wealth of opportunities for brilliant kids" according to the New York Post. All Hunter students pursue a six-year program of study. Hunter is a college preparatory high school that provides a liberal arts education. The majority of subjects are accelerated such that high school study begins in the 8th grade and state educational requirements are completed in the 11th. During the 12th grade, students take electives, have the option to attend courses at Hunter College (for transferable credit), undertake independent academic studies, and participate in internships around the city.

Students in grades 7 and 8 are required to take courses in communications and theater (a curriculum that includes drama, storytelling, and theater). Students in grades 7–9 must take both art and music, each for half a year, and then choose one to take in tenth grade. One of the four available foreign language courses (French, Latin, Mandarin, or Spanish) must be taken each year in grades 7–10, and Advanced Placement (AP) language electives are offered through the 12th grade. A year each of biology, chemistry, and physics must be completed in addition to the introductory science classes of life science and physical science in the 7th and 8th grades, respectively. During 7th and 8th grades, students must also participate in the school's science fair; the fair is optional for older students. After the introductory 7th grade social studies course, 4 semesters of global studies (8th-9th grades) and 2 semesters (10th grade) are followed by 2 semesters of 20th century history (11th grade). A series of English and mathematics courses are taught from 7th through 11th grades. (The math curriculum is split into a track of "honors" and a track of "extended honors" classes for students of different strengths after 7th grade). If students pass a placement test, they are able to skip a grade and attend classes of a higher grade (for example, a student who passes the test in 7th grade and is currently in 8th grade can take 9th grade "extended honors" mathematics.) Two semesters of physical education are taught each year, including swimming in the 8th grade (held at Hunter College). In 9th grade, students are required to take a CPR course for one semester and a computer science course the other semester. Starting in their junior year, students are allowed to take a limited number of electives and AP courses. The senior year, however, is free of mandated courses except for a year of physical education electives and courses to fulfill leftover educational requirements.

Hunter's English Department incorporates reading novels and writing analytical papers beginning in the 7th grade. Students have historically graduated with strong writing and reading comprehension skills, reflected by the school's high average SAT scores in critical reading and writing, and by the number of students who have earned recognition by the scholastic writing awards.

Upper-level electives and AP courses are offered by all six academic departments. AP courses include: AP Computer Science, AP Calculus AB and BC, AP Microeconomics and AP Macroeconomics, AP Psychology, AP European History, AP Chemistry, AP Physics C, AP Biology, AP Statistics, AP Spanish, AP French, AP Mandarin, and AP Latin (Virgil). The English Department previously offered AP English and Literature but has since replaced it with the elective Advanced Essay Writing. Other electives include: Introduction to African-American Studies, "Race, Class, and Gender", International Relations, US Constitutional Law, Classical Mythology, Photography, Astrophysics, Advanced Art History I & II, Organic Chemistry, Creative Writing, Joyce's Ulysses, Shakespeare's Comedies and Romance/Shakespeare's Tragedies and Histories, and Physiology. Hunter's AP offerings are currently being evaluated by the Faculty and Curriculum Committee. The class of 2013 took 366 AP tests (≈1.8 per student) with an average score of 4.5.

There were 87 faculty members in 2013. 89% had advanced degrees. Many teachers are scientists, writers, artists, and musicians. Many come to Hunter with university-level teaching experience. The student/faculty ratio is 13:1, much lower than the city's other selective public schools (e.g. Stuyvesant = 22:1).

Nearly 99% of Hunter's classes of 2002 through 2005 went directly to college, and about 25% of these students accepted admission into an Ivy League school. Worth reported that 9.4% of Hunter's classes of 1998 through 2001 attended Harvard, Yale or Princeton (the highest rate of any public school in the United States). In 2006–2007, 73 of the graduating seniors were accepted into at least one Ivy League school, constituting approximately 40% of the whole class.

In the graduating class of 2015, out of about 190 students, Hunter received 89 total acceptances from the Ivy League, and ultimately, 56 students (≈30%) matriculated into one of the eight Ivy League schools. There are six guidance counselors serving the student population. Each junior and senior is assigned a college guidance counselor.

Hunter students win many honors and awards during their high school careers, including numerous scholastic writing awards. Hunter wins approximately 23% of all New York State Scholastic Art and Writing Awards. 74 members of the Class of 2013 (38%) were National Merit or National Achievement Scholarship Semifinalists. Of particular fame are the winners of the Regeneron Science Talent Search (formerly Intel and Westinghouse STS), of which Hunter has had four: Amy Reichel in 1981, Adam Cohen ('97, now a professor in the Chemistry and Physics Departments at Harvard) in 1997, David L.V. Bauer ('05) in 2005, and Benjy Firester ('18) in 2018. In addition, two of New York State's four 2005 Presidential Scholars were Hunter College High School seniors. Sandra Fong ('08) represented the United States in the 2008 Summer Olympics held in Beijing. She competed in the rifle shooting competition.

Publicly available data indicate that Hunter has both the highest average SAT score and the highest average ACT score of any school in the United States, public or private, though complete data is needed to be conclusive. For the graduating class of 2012, the average SAT score was a 2207. The class of 2013 averaged 2200 on the test and the class of 2016 averaged 2208. The class of 2013 scored an average of 32.6 on the ACT.

Extracurricular activities
Hunter offers many extra- and co-curricular offerings for a small school: 32 varsity teams, 14 co-curricular organizations, five music groups, four theater groups, student government, 22 publications and over 130 clubs. Clubs are diverse in their topics, and include politics, film, music, and knitting. Clubs and organizations at Hunter are all student-run, with faculty members as advisers. During club open house, members of the student body have the opportunity to spend their lunch time meeting representatives of clubs. The school publishes a list of clubs available in this footnote’s link.

Student government
The General Organization (G.O.) represents the student body. The executive board is composed of tenth through twelfth graders, elected by the student body, and includes a president, administrative vice president, activities vice president, treasurer, publicity secretary, and recording secretary. These officers organize school activities and communicate with the administration and faculty, frequently becoming involved in school policy. The G.O. organizes school-wide events such as Spirit Day, a school-wide outdoor recreation day usually held in October, and Carnival, held at the end of the school year.

Term Councils are grade governing bodies. They elect two senators for each grade who share their concerns with the G.O. They also plan grade-wide events such as dances and fundraisers, as well as the Semiformal and Prom.

Co-curricular activities
Students can choose to further pursue their academic interests through school activities such as the National Economics Challenge, Hunter United Nations Society, Fed Challenge (economics), Mock Trial, Debate Team, Math Team, the Hunter Chess and Go Teams, Quiz Bowl, Science Bowl, History Bowl, FIRST Robotics, and the Washington Seminar. The Economics Challenge (run by the Council for Economic Education) team was formed in 2013 by two juniors and one sophomore, who subsequently led the Hunter team to become National Champions of the David Ricardo division in their inaugural year. The Hunter Chess Team has won numerous tournaments and championships. The Washington Seminar on Government in Action was introduced in the 1950s; students selected for this program research public policy issues throughout the year; arrange meetings with various public figures in Washington, D.C.; and then meet with them for questioning and discussion regarding their researched issue during a three-day trip in May. The Mock Trial team was the top team from New York City in 2015. The debate team is completely student run and is nationally recognized and attends various tournaments throughout the year including tournaments at universities such as Harvard, Yale and Princeton. The Middle School debate team is a top-ranked team, that took the top three spots at the Middle School Public Debate Program's National Invitational Tournament at Claremont McKenna College in 2013. Hunter's Quiz Bowl team was started in 2006, and was nationally ranked in its inaugural year. The Quiz Bowl team went on to gain the title of national champions at the 2012 PACE National Scholastic Championship and was runner-up in 2020. Hunter won the 2016 and 2017 High School National Championship Tournaments and also placed second in 2022. The middle school team also won first place at the 2019 Middle School National Championship Tournaments. The History Bowl team were varsity national champions in the 2012 National History Bee and Bowl during its second year and won junior varsity championships in 2015 and 2019. The Robotics team, started in 2009, takes part in FIRST Robotics Competition won the Chesapeake regional in 2012. The Science Bowl Team placed 4th and 9th at the National Science Bowl championships in 2011 and 2012.

Musical extracurriculars
Students with substantial musical training can choose to enroll in the String Ensembles, Band, and/or Chorus groups. In 2002, the music groups toured in Spain, performing a number of collaborative pieces. They toured Greece in 2006 and Budapest in 2008.

The string ensembles are divided into "Strings" and "Chamber Orchestra", the latter being a much more selective group. They have performed a number of both contemporary and traditional pieces. The band is a woodwind-brass-percussion ensemble, and their focus is mainly on contemporary music, though they sometimes branch off into classical pieces such as Mozart's Horn Concerto in E Flat. Chorus is divided into the concert choir and the chamber choir. The concert choir is a larger group than the chamber choir, and consists of members from the tenth to twelfth grades. Students can audition for a jazz chorus, founded by former music teacher Campbell Austin, which focuses solely on jazz music. The Jazz Band is split into Junior Jazz (grades 7–9) and Senior Jazz (grades 10–12), and performs arrangements of jazz music during Art Festivals, which are biannual.

Students may also audition for Junior Orchestra (grades 7–8, except in special cases) or Senior Orchestra (grades 9–12, except in special cases), which perform in the two semi-annual concerts at Hunter, the Winter Concert and the Spring Concert. The concerts for the Junior Orchestra and Senior Orchestra are divided into two distinct concerts, the "Middle School Concert" and the "Winter (or Spring) concert", respectively.

Sports
Hunter's sports teams are extremely competitive given the school's size; several, including both Girls' and Boys' Volleyball, Swimming, Wrestling, Fencing, Golf, Tennis, and Lacrosse are usually among the top 10 in the city. The number of varsity teams (32) that compete in the Public Schools Athletic League (PSAL) is also an exceptional number, given the school's size. These sports are cross-country (boys' and girls' varsity), soccer (boys' varsity, junior varsity and middle school and girls' varsity and middle school), swimming (boys' and girls' varsity and co-ed middle school), volleyball (boys' varsity and girls' varsity, junior varsity and middle school), golf (coed and girls' varsity), basketball (boys have two middle school teams, one junior varsity team, and one varsity team, while the girls' have one middle school and one varsity team), indoor track (boys' and girls' varsity, middle school, and recently it was extended to the elementary school as well), outdoor track (boys' and girls' varsity, middle school and elementary), baseball (boys' middle school and varsity), softball (girls' middle school and varsity), lacrosse (boys' and girls' varsity and junior varsity), tennis (boys' and girls' varsity), ultimate (boys' and girls' varsity), bowling (Co-Ed varsity), fencing (boys' and girls' varsity), badminton (boys' and girls' varsity), handball (coed varsity) and wrestling (boys' and girls' varsity and co-ed middle school).

Many teams are called "Hunter Hawks" because the school mascot is a hawk. Some exceptions, however, are the boys' volleyball team (Hunter Hitmen), the girls' volleyball team (Headhunters), the girls' swim team (Hunter Duckies), and the Ultimate Frisbee teams (Hunter Halcyons).

In the 1983–84 school year, the Hunter Heat, Hunter's bowling team, finished as the top team in Manhattan, Staten Island, and the Bronx, losing to Cardozo High School (number one team in Queens and Brooklyn) in the PSAL city championship. Benjamin Sobel ('12) bowled for Ohio State University after great success in the high school level, both in PSAL and nationally.

In 1984 the boys' cross country team, in its second year in existence, defeated George Washington High School for the Manhattan Championship. The boys' X-C team upset a George Washington squad that had not lost the Manhattan X-C championship in twelve years.

In 1988 and 1995, the boys' volleyball team won the New York City PSAL title. In 1992, 1993 and 1994 the girls volleyball team reached the New York City PSAL championships, clinching a win only in the autumn 1994 final. In more recent years, a few teams have made runs at the city championship. During the 1998–2001 era, an unusual concentration of athletic talent led the basketball team deep into the PSAL playoffs for 3 consecutive seasons. In 2005, the boys' volleyball team finished 4th in the city, the girls' soccer team reached the playoff semifinals, and co-ed fencing finished 3rd in the city. In 2008 the girls middle school soccer team were undefeated in the entire season and won the league. In the winter of 2005, co-ed fencing captured the city title. This was quickly followed, on November 22, 2005, with the Hunter Girls Varsity Volleyball team's defeat of JFK High School to become the New York City Champions.

Boys' and girls' swimming were also successful in 2005. The boys' swimming team defeated its rival, Bronx Science, breaking a 15-year dry spell against the school. The girls had the first ever tie in PSAL Playoff history against Brooklyn Technical High School (47–47). The win was later awarded to Hunter. In 2009 Hunter's girls swim team beat rival school Bronx Science for the first time in nine years by six points.

During the 2005–2006 school year, the girls' volleyball team won the PSAL city championship after many years of falling short of the championship, losing in the semifinals and finals.

The girls' and boys' tennis teams also did well in the 2006 season, with the girls' team ranked 4th in the city, and the boys' team ranked 7th. In 2008, the tennis team reached the A division finals but lost to top-seeded Beacon.

In the winter of 2006 the boys' fencing team won the PSAL city championship for the second year in a row, beating rival school Stuyvesant in the finals. It has since captured the silver medal in winter 2008, losing to Stuyvesant in the final, and the bronze medal in winter 09, again losing to Stuyvesant, after beating them twice during an undefeated regular season to win the division championship. It proceeded win the city championship again in 2011, followed by bronze in 2012, and silver in 2013. Following another undefeated season, the team took first place in 2014, winning in a single-touch tie-breaker against rival Brooklyn Technical High School.

In the 2009–2014 seasons, the Girls' Varsity Fencing Team won five consecutive PSAL championships.

Hunter's varsity baseball and basketball teams were relegated to the B Division at the beginning of the 2006–07 school year, and reacted well to these changes. Both teams made deep playoff runs, with basketball losing in the second round, and baseball upsetting the second seeded team and losing in the quarterfinals. In the spring of 2008, the baseball team lost in the second round of the playoffs to eventual finalist and top-seeded Bayard Rustin. In the 2008–2009 school year, the varsity basketball team rejoined the A division and achieved an impressive undefeated record.

At the beginning of the 2007–08 school year, Hunter's boys varsity soccer team also moved to the B Division of the PSAL, and finished the season with a 7–1 record, culminating in a heartbreaking playoff loss.

In 2010, Hunter's boys varsity soccer team, under the lead of returning Coach Asumana Randolph, defied all odds by winning their division, and winning the first round of playoffs in overtime, a game which in past seasons has been the last. They went on to win the quarter finals, playing the defending champion, Queens Vocational, and also to win semi-finals. Hunter continued their streak to the championship, where they played Monroe Campus and won in a shut out; 3–0, becoming the first Hunter Boys' soccer team to win the PSAL championship. A rough game, the championship was won at the cost of broken leg of Captain Emmett Kim, who was injured while scoring a goal. Standout Julian Ricardo also was injured, tearing his ACL, but continued to play on. Coach Asumana Randolph, ecstatic about the magnificent season, promised the team an African dinner; motivation which helped them push through each playoff round.

In 2011, both the Boys' and Girls' varsity lacrosse teams won the PSAL Bowl Division Championships. In 2013 Boys' Lacrosse won the City Championship against Tottenville. That season, prior to winning the City Championship, they were ranked third overall among all city schools, both public and private (after first-ranked Dalton and second-ranked Tottenville).

In the 2012 season, the Boys' Middle School Soccer Team were the Citywide PSAL Champions winning the finals against Salk.

In the 2016 season, the Girls' varsity golf team won the citywide PSAL championship, defeating Bronx Science High School 5–0 in the finals. The team went on to win the city championship in the 2017 and 2018 seasons as well, capturing the title for three years in a row. In the 2021 season, the Girls' Varsity Golf team won the citywide PSAL Championship by defeating Staten Island Technical High School 3-2 in the final.

In the 2019 season, the Boys' Middle School Soccer Team won the City Championships, and in the 2020 season, the Boys' Varsity Soccer Team reached the Manhattan Championships, but lost to Middle College High School in penalty kicks, 4–3. In the 2021 season, Hunter again lost to Middle College High School in the finals on penalty kicks, losing 5-4.

In the 2021 season, the Girls Varsity Soccer Team triumphed over Brooklyn Technical High School with a decisive 4-1 victory to finish an undefeated, division winning season.

The Athletic Association (AA) is an organization of varsity athletes that promotes school spirit and the interests of student athletes. The AA organizes intramural tournaments, sells Hunter apparel, and promotes sporting events. The AA coordinates and executes Sports Banquet and the annual Junior-Senior football games during Spirit Day as well.

Student publications
Hunter has many student publications, including its official newspapers, What's What and The Observer. Student-produced magazines include Annals(the school's yearbook),  Coloring Book (creative magazine for all grades), Argus (literature and art magazine for the 10th-12th grades), "The Hunter Economist" (political and economic commentary), Chapter 11 (satire), The Precipice (climate justice),Tapestry (science fiction and fantasy), Radicals (math), "The Desk" (literature and art magazine for the 7th-9th grades),The Idealist (social justice), The Leading Strand (science), "F-Stop" (photography), "Noteworthy" (music), "Purple Politico" (politics), "Violet" (popular culture and fashion magazine), "Rewind Magazine" (movies and media), "Storyboard" (a comic/graphic novel compilation), "Artillery" (student art), T.H.A.T. Theatre Review (theater), "Eats" (recipes, restaurant reviews, and food-interest stories), "Grapevine" (popular culture), "Palette" (LGBTQ+ art and literature), and Polyglot (foreign language literature).

Theater productions
The Hunter theater program is an active one, often with a season of five main-stage productions and many other showcase productions. In a season of four main-stage productions, they normally fall into these categories: a Shakespeare play (often referred to as Shax); a Musical (Musical Repertoire, often referred to as REP); Hunter Classics, a middle school play for students in grades 7 through 9; and the Brick Prison Playhouse, commonly referred to simply as "Brick", showcasing several student-written plays. There are likewise two Theater Production Practicum (TPP) showcases (grades 9-10), with student-written, directed, and designed performances (through the class TPP), as well as a 7th grade play festival. In the 2016–17 school year, the theatre season consisted of Musical Rep, followed by a student directed straight play, followed by Classics, then Brick. Since the 2017–2018 school year, Black Box theater productions have been performed, with several notably being directed by students. Many cultural clubs also produce performances highlighting their culture, such as SAYA (South Asian Cultural Society), ACS (Asian Cultural Society), JCAC (Jewish Cultural Awareness Club), BSU (Black Student Union, formerly African American Cultural Society), MSA (Muslim Students Association), and more.

School events and traditions

Students at Hunter often enjoy various social events that are sponsored by the school administration, faculty and the student-run General Organization (G.O.). These include:
 Seventh Grade Picnic: an orientation and welcoming event held in Central Park at the end of September. Seventh-graders play various sports and become more familiar with each other under the supervision of 11th grade "Big Sibs". For the last few years, it has always rained on this day, leading it to occur indoors. In 2020, due to the pandemic, the class of 2026 didn't get a picnic. However, the following year, the class of 2027 continued the tradition that had gone on a 1 year hiatus. 
 Spirit Week: a week in October in which each day consists of activities centered around a "theme" (e.g. retro) as designated by the G.O. It was created in the 1990s as a replacement for a spring "Field Day", which was once organized by the Athletic Association.
 Spirit Day: the second to last day of Spirit Week. (Unless it rains, then Spirit Day is held sometime in the spring or a date within a few weeks of the original.) It is a day-long school-wide excursion to a recreation spot. The trip is often to Bear Mountain State Park, but destinations have included Belmont Lake State Park, Playland, Central Park, or Randall's Island. It includes the annual Senior-Junior football game.
 Homecoming: a day in which the previous year's graduates return to the school to revisit current students in December. There is usually a basketball game on this day.
 Senior Walkout: carried out on the first day of snowfall. Seniors leave class for the day to engage in snowball fights or pursue other activities outside of the school with parents of seniors providing refreshments. Originally an act of rebellion, in recent years the event has become a school-sanctioned ritual and is done in consultation with the administration.
 Ski trip: An unofficial parent-planned trip that occurs on the last weekend of January, during intersession, which is the space between midterms and the 2nd semester.
 Carnival: a major end-of-year event for the student body. It usually has a theme, features both live and recorded music, and stalls run by various school clubs that showcase games, food, or other items of interest.
 Senior Week: traditionally the week after Carnival and before graduation. During this week, there are events designed to say goodbye to the graduating seniors. They include:
 Senior Tea: students of the graduating class are presented with white carnations and served refreshments by their teachers.
 Senior Barbecue: graduating students serve lunch to the faculty.
 In addition to these, the hall of the graduating class becomes off limits to all but members of said graduating class. In 2011, an agreement was reached to let faculty through.
 "Intel Trip": A trip run by the Hunter Science department that takes students to Washington D.C. to view Intel Science Project finalists and sightseeing in surrounding areas.
Several formal dances are arranged throughout the year:
 Prom is a similar event to many proms held all across the United States, consisting of formal dress and a sit-down dinner. The event is usually followed by an after-party at a student's house. In June 2001, Prom was held at the World Trade Center (Windows on the World). Prom is held on a Thursday evening. Attendees return to school on Friday in their finery so students and teachers can admire their glamorous outfits.
 Semi-formal is the "junior prom," held for eleventh graders at the end of January.
 Lower-termers have their own annual dances, including dances for Valentine's Day and Halloween for the seventh and eighth graders. In some years, there may also be themed dances; for example, in 2006, dances included the Halloween and Valentines' Dances as well as a "Black, White, and Silver Dance" for seventh and eighth graders.

Several classes and extracurricular groups hold annual trips outside of New York City. International trips include the bi-annual AP Art History trip, the Shakespeare Etc. club trip, Foreign Language cultural trips, and trips taken by various school-run musical groups (such as Jazz Band or Chorus).

Alumni
Notable alumni include:

 Shirley Abrahamson (class of 1950) – first female Justice, first female Chief Justice and longest ever serving Justice, Wisconsin Supreme Court; past President,  Conference of [Supreme Court] Chief Justices
 Randy Altschuler (class of 1989) – co-founder, OfficeTiger; U.S. Congressional Candidate, New York's 1st congressional district
 Birdie Amsterdam (class of 1918) – first female New York State Supreme Court Justice
 Charles Ardai (class of 1987) – founder and CEO, Juno; managing director, D.E. Shaw; author, editor, publisher/co-founder of Hard Case Crime, TV producer of Haven
 Martina Arroyo (class of 1953) – opera singer, fellow, American Academy of Arts and Sciences; member, National Council of the Arts; Kennedy Center Honoree; director, Carnegie Hall and Hunter College
 Eli Attie (class of 1985) – TV writer and producer, Emmy winner and former chief speechwriter for Al Gore
 Michelle Au (class of 1995) – Georgia State Senator
 Rachel Axler (class of 1995) – four-time Emmy-winning TV writer
 Kyle Baker (class of 1983) – comic book artist/writer, cartoonist, animator and satirist
 Maria Bentel (class of 1946) – American architect and founding partner of the architecture firm Bentel & Bentel Architects/Planners A.I.A
 Adam Berinsky (class of 1988) – Mitsui Professor of Political Science at MIT
 Etel Billig (unknown) – actress and founder of Illinois Theatre Center
 Chana Bloch (class of 1957) – poet, translator
 Jeremy Blachman (class of 1996) – author, journalist, lawyer
 Angela Bofill (class of 1972) – jazz singer
 Anise Boyer (unknown) - actress and dancer known for her work during the Harlem Renaissance
 Suse Broyde – Professor of Structural Biology at New York University
 Michael A. Burstein (class of 1987) – science fiction writer
 Hortense Calisher (class of 1928) – novelist, second female President, American Academy of Arts and Letters
 Sewell Chan (class of 1994) – editor, The New York Times
 Peggy Charren (class of 1949) - activist and founder of Action for Children's Television, Presidential Medal of Freedom recipient
 Perry Chen (class of 1994) – co-founder, Kickstarter
 Dorothy Chin-Brandt – First Asian-American elected official in New York State. 
 Louise Cochrane (circa class of 1936) – one of the first female TV producers
 Adam Cohen (class of 1997) – chemist and physicist, Harvard University
 Noam Cohen (class of 1985) – technology journalist 
 Christopher Collet (class of 1986) – actor
 Olivia Cole (class of 1960) – actress, first African-American Emmy winner
 Nicholas Confessore (class of 1994) – Pulitzer Prize-winning political correspondent, The New York Times
 Constance E. Cook (circa class of 1937) – New York State Assembly Member
 Gloria M. Coruzzi (class of 1972) - Plant Molecular Biologist, Professor and Past-Chair of Biology, NYU, Member of the National Academy of Sciences.
 Marie Maynard Daly – first African-American to receive a Ph.D. from Columbia University; first black woman in the United States to earn a Ph.D. in chemistry.
 Jon Daniels (class of 1995) – Texas Rangers General Manager; youngest-ever MLB GM
 Amy Davidson Sorkin (class of 1988) – executive editor of The New Yorker
 Lucy Dawidowicz (class of 1932) – Holocaust historian
 Manohla Dargis (class of 1979) – chief film critic, The New York Times
 Ruby Dee (class of 1939) – National Medal of Arts, Grammy, Emmy, Obie, Drama Desk, SAG and SAG Lifetime Achievement Award-winning actress; nominee for Academy Award for Best Supporting Actress; African American rights activist, poet, playwright, screenwriter and journalist
 Desmond Devlin (class of 1982) – writer, MAD Magazine
 Ophelia Devore (class of 1936) – first mixed-race model, founder-Grace Del Marco agency.
 Diane di Prima (class of 1951) – poet
 Mildred S. Dresselhaus (class of 1947) – Presidential Medal of Freedom winner; first female Institute Professor, Massachusetts Institute of Technology; first and only female winner of the National Medal of Science in engineering; past President, American Association for the Advancement of Science
 Jane Dubin (class of 1974) – Tony winning Broadway producer
 Sandi Simcha DuBowski (class of 1988) – filmmaker
 Dujeous (class of 1995) – (original members), hip-hop group
 Helen Epstein (class of 1965) – first female tenured journalism professor, New York University, author
 Jewlia Eisenberg (class of 1988) – composer and musician
 Yvette Fay Francis-McBarnette (class of circa 1941) – pioneering hematologist
 Sandra Fong (class of 2008) – Olympic athlete (shooting)
 Richard (DiMasi) Fontana (class of 1986) – free software and open source lawyer
 Michael C. Frank (class of 1999) – developmental psychologist, Stanford University
 Linda P. Fried (class of 1966) – first female Dean, Columbia University School of Public Health
 Susan Fuhrman (class of 1961) – first female President, Teachers College, Columbia University; President, National Academy of Education; former Dean, University of Pennsylvania Graduate School of Education
 Hortense Gabel (circa class of 1930) – New York State Supreme Court Justice
 Leila Gerstein (class of 1990) – Emmy-winning TV producer and writer 
 Eleanor Glueck (class of 1916) – criminologist, Harvard University
 Jamal Greene (class of 1995) – professor of law, Columbia Law School
 Martha Greenhouse (class of 1939) – actress and union leader
 Judd Greenstein (class of 1997) – Composer, co-founder of New Amsterdam Records
 Irene Greif (class of 1965) – computer scientist
 Brett Haber (class of 1987) – Emmy-winning former ESPN SportsCenter anchor, current Tennis Channel & NBC Olympics host
 E. Adelaide Hahn (circa class of 1911) – first female president, Linguistic Society of America
 Avril Haines (class of 1987) – first female Director of National Intelligence, Deputy National Security Advisor and Deputy Director of the Central Intelligence Agency
 Evelyn Handler (class of 1950) – first female President of both the University of New Hampshire and Brandeis University
 Christopher Hayes (class of 1997) – Two-time Emmy winning host, "All In with Chris Hayes", MSNBC, editor-at-large, "The Nation"
 Bernadine Healy (class of 1962) – first female NIH director and Red Cross president
 Carrie Kei Heim (class of 1991) – actress, lawyer
 Jonathan Hoefler (class of 1988) – typeface designer
 Steve Hofstetter (class of 1997) – comedian/radio personality
 Adam Horowitz (class of 1990) – TV writer and producer, screenwriter
 Florence Howe (class of 1946) – feminist activist
 Immortal Technique (class of 1996) – rapper/political activist
 Chris Jackson (class of 1989) – publisher
 Keisha Sutton James – Deputy Manhattan Borough President
 Julia Jarcho – experimental playwright
 Elena Kagan (class of 1977) – United States Supreme Court Justice, first female United States Solicitor General and first female Dean of Harvard Law School
 Jeremy Kahn (class of 1987) - Mathematician
 Eric Kaplan (class of 1985) – TV writer and producer
 Elizabeth (Sister Mary Cordia) Karl (class of 1916) - mathematician 
 Max Kellerman (class of 1991) – host, HBO Boxing, ESPN SportsNation
 Dave Kerpen (class of 1994) - NY Times Best-Selling author, entrepreneur, speaker 
 Alice Kober (class of 1924) – classicist, the major contributor to the deciphering of Linear B form of Ancient Greek
 Karen Kornbluh (class of 1981) – U.S. Ambassador to OECD, primary drafter of 2008 Democratic Party platform
 Jean Kwok (class of 1986) – novelist
 Diane Lane (dropped out) – Academy Award nominee for best actress
 Evelyn Lauder (class of 1954) – philanthropist
 Jennifer 8. Lee (class of 1994) – The New York Times journalist and author
 Adam Leon (class of 1999) – film director and writer
 Marilyn Levy (class of 1938) – photographic chemist at Fort Monmouth
 Judy Lewent (class of 1966) – director of Dell, GlaxoSmithKline, Motorola and MIT and former Exec. VP and CFO of Merck
 Robert Lopez (class of 1993) – Avenue Q, Book of Mormon, Frozen, and Coco composer-lyricist, youngest EGOT (Emmy (3), Grammy (3), Oscar (2) and Tony(3)) winner
 Audre Lorde (class of 1951) – poet, professor
 Mynette Louie (class of 1993) – film & TV producer; professor
 Nava Lubelski (class of 1986) – artist and author
 Nnenna Lynch (class of 1989) – track and cross country runner
 Shola Lynch (class of 1987) – film maker
 Mike Maronna (class of 1995) – actor (The Adventures of Pete & Pete)
 Judith Matloff (class of 1976) – author and journalism professor
 Annette Michelson - film critic and writer
 Donna Minkowitz (class of 1981) – writer and journalist
 Lin-Manuel Miranda (class of 1998) – winner of a Pulitzer Prize, three Grammys, two Emmys, a MacArthur "Genius" Award and three Tony awards; creator and lead, Hamilton and In The Heights
 Samantha Massell (class of 2008) – Actress
 Maria Muldaur (circa class of 1961) – folk singer
 Elizabeth Neufeld (circa class of 1944) – geneticist; second female winner of the Wolf Prize in Medicine; winner of the National Medal of Science and the Lasker Award
 Thisbe Nissen (class of 1990) – novelist
 Cynthia Nixon (class of 1984) – Tony, Grammy and (2) Emmy award-winning actress
 Mollie Orshansky (class of 1931) – statistician
 Cynthia Ozick (class of 1946) – novelist
 Ellen Ash Peters (class of 1947) – first female Justice and first female Chief Justice, Connecticut Supreme Court, first female President, Conference of Supreme Court Chief Justices
 Marina Picciotto (class of 1981) – neuroscientist
 Pearl Primus (class of 1936) – choreographer/dancer
 Jennifer Raab (class of 1973) – President, Hunter College
 Margaret Raymond (class of 1976) – Dean and law professor, University of Wisconsin Law School
 Mina Rees (class of 1919) – Mathematician, King's Medal for Service in the Cause of Freedom (UK) winner; National Academies of Science Public Welfare Medal winner; first female President and first President Emerita, Graduate School and University Center at CUNY; first female President of American Association for the Advancement of Science
 Eunice Reddick (class of 1969) – US Ambassador to Niger, Gabon and São Tomé and Príncipe
 Vivian Reiss (class of 1970) – artist
 Gloria Rojas (class of 1955) – journalist
 Stefan Savage (class of 1987) - computer scientist, 2017 MacArthur Foundation Fellow
 Bruce Schneier (class of 1981) – security expert
 Sarah Schulman (class of 1975) – artist, writer, journalist, English Professor
 Lois G. Schwoerer (class of 1945) – historian
 Susan Sheehan (class of 1954) – journalist, Pulitzer Prize winning author
 Martin Shkreli (did not graduate) - pharmaceutical CEO, felon
 Larissa Shmailo (class of 1974) – poet, translator, novelist, editor, and critic
 Amy Sohn (class of 1991) – novelist
 Christina Sormani (class of 1987) - mathematician, AMS Fellow
 Olivia P. Stokes - Baptist minister
 Jeannie Suk (class of 1991) – first female Asian-American tenured professor, Harvard Law School
 Deborah Tannen (class of 1962) – professor of linguistics, Georgetown University, author, You Just Don't Understand
 Judith Jarvis Thomson (class of 1946) – professor emerita of philosophy, MIT
 Michal Towber (class of 1998) – singer-songwriter, Emmy winning composer
 Tien Tzuo, (class of 1986) - tech entrepreneur
 Rebecca Wasserman-Hone - American wine expert based in France
 Alma S. Woolley (class of 1950) – dean and professor emerita of Georgetown University School of Nursing and Health Studies, author, historian
 Marvin "Young MC" Young (class of 1985) – rapper, music producer and songwriter
 Nancy Yao (class of 1990) – Founding Director, Smithsonian American Womens History Museum

See also
 Education in New York City
 Hunter College Elementary School

References

External links

 Hunter College High School
 Hunter College High School wiki
 Hunter College High School Alumnae/i Association
 Hunter College High School PTA
 Hunter Athletics
 Hunter College High School - College Profile 2012-2013 (excellent overview of the school)
 Hunter Quiz Bowl Team

Public high schools in Manhattan
Magnet schools in New York (state)
Hunter College
Educational institutions established in 1869
University-affiliated schools in the United States
Gifted education
Upper East Side
1869 establishments in New York (state)